In Greek mythology, Eurydice (/jʊəˈrɪdɪsi/; Ancient Greek: Εὐρυδίκη, Eurydikē "wide justice", derived from ευρυς eurys "wide" and δικη dike "justice) was the daughter of Pelops and was married to Electryon, king of Mycenae and son of  Perseus. She gave birth to Alcmena, mother of Heracles. In other versions of the myth, Eurydice's place was taken by Anaxo, Electryon's niece.

Notes

References 
 Diodorus Siculus, The Library of History translated by Charles Henry Oldfather. Twelve volumes. Loeb Classical Library. Cambridge, Massachusetts: Harvard University Press; London: William Heinemann, Ltd. 1989. Vol. 3. Books 4.59–8. Online version at Bill Thayer's Web Site
Diodorus Siculus, Bibliotheca Historica. Vol 1-2. Immanel Bekker. Ludwig Dindorf. Friedrich Vogel. in aedibus B. G. Teubneri. Leipzig. 1888-1890. Greek text available at the Perseus Digital Library.
Patricia Turner, Charles Russell Coulter, "Dictionary of ancient deities", Oxford University Press, 2001, 

Princesses in Greek mythology
Queens in Greek mythology